Keith Lorenzo Goganious (born December 7, 1968) is a former American football player and coach. He played professionally as a linebacker in the National Football League (NFL) for five seasons with the Buffalo Bills, Jacksonville Jaguars and Baltimore Ravens. He played college football at Pennsylvania State University.

Goganious served as head football coach and assistant athletic director of the Bishop McNamara High School in Prince George's County, Maryland from 2013 to 2016. He was an assistant coach at Hampton University from 2009 to 2013.

References

External links
 Hampton profile
 

1968 births
Living people
American football linebackers
Baltimore Ravens players
Buffalo Bills players
Hampton Pirates football coaches
Jacksonville Jaguars players
High school football coaches in Maryland
Penn State Nittany Lions football players
Sportspeople from Virginia Beach, Virginia
Coaches of American football from Virginia
Players of American football from Virginia
African-American coaches of American football
African-American players of American football
21st-century African-American people
20th-century African-American sportspeople